Will Lawton (born 24 June 1974) is a British singer-songwriter, pianist, hang player, and music therapist. He has been the song-writing force behind four EPs and six studio albums. Lawton’s music “weaves a tapestry of live piano with a supple and distinctive voice that speaks of love and loss, truth and lies, the whole spectrum of this painful, yet magical existence we call life”.  He draws inspiration from singer-songwriters including Ray LaMontagne, Eddie Vedder, Nick Drake and Ben Harper.

Music career 
Lawton began his musical career after forming Orangutan with guitarist and drummer Joe Holweger and recording the Surprised Coconut EP in west London. In 2001, Lawton with Neil Muttock on guitar formed The Zennor Project with band members Tracy Jane Sullivan, Peter Van Pletzen and Ashley Moffatt and released the Twist EP. Lawton, Holweger and Muttock reconvened and went on to release two albums, The Monkey and the Whale by Brontosaurus in 2006, and Ember by Orangutan in 2008

In 2012, Lawton performed with The Heavy. He went onto record a solo project, The Wood Room Session at Real World Studios.  He formed The Home Fires with Neil Muttock and Nikki Capp and performed at Priddy Folk Festival and Purbeck Folk Festival in 2012. Following a successful crowdfunding campaign, the band recorded This Too Shall Pass at Real World Studios, which featured musicians Phillip Henry (dobro), Hannah Martin (violin and vocals) and Bethany Porter (cello and vocals).

Lawton started working with drummer Weasel Howlett in 2015 and the duo went onto write and record Fossils of the Mind at Real World Studios. The album was released in 2017, with a vinyl release the following year after a successful crowdfunding campaign through Kickstarter. As of 2019, the band are active and regularly joined by Buddy Fonzarelli on bass guitar, Ami Kaelyn on guitar and vocals and Harki Popli on tabla. They recorded a live session in March 2019 in the library at Abbey House in Malmesbury and released 'Abbey House Session' in 2020. Lawton currently performs solo, with his band and works as a music therapist.  To accommodate the growing number of current band members, the band currently perform as 'Will Lawton and the Alchemists' and re-released 'Fossils of the Mind' under this name in 2020.

In April 2020, Will collaborated with a group of poets that he had never met after issuing an appeal for original poetry written during the time that the UK was in lockdown.  He composed, recorded and co-produced 'Salt of the Earth' which was co-produced, mixed and mastered by Patrick Phillips.  Each poem is embedded in meditative piano and ambient soundscapes and was released digitally in May 2020.

Lawton met Argentinian guitarist Ludwig Mack in October 2020 through Instagram.  Mack had travelled to the UK to meet British musicians but arrived just hours before the first national lockdown.  Stranded in a cottage in Hullavington, Wiltshire, the duo realised they lived only a few miles away from each other and began collaborating before recording and releasing a four track EP called ‘Heroes’, recorded and produced by Lucas Drinkwater at Polyphonic Recording in Stroud.

Lawton has had radio play on BBC Wiltshire, BBC Bristol, BBC Somerset, BBC Airwaves Festival, BBC Introducing and Scala Radio.  His live performance has been described by Slap Magazine as “melodic and inventive…..a truly breath-taking performance” and the music with his band has been described as “gloriously unique and brilliantly exploratory” by Greenman publications and “refreshing, fascinating and exciting” by Ocelot magazine.

Discography

Will Lawton and Joe Holweger 

 A Strange Thing EP, 2021

Will Lawton and Ludwig Mack 

 Heroes EP, 2021

Will Lawton 
 Salt of the Earth, Vol. 1 (Lockdown), 2020
 The Wood Room Sessions, 2012

Will Lawton and the Alchemists 
 Abbey House Session, 2020
 Fossils of the Mind, 2017 (originally released as Will Lawton & Weasel Howlett)

The Home Fires 
 This Too Shall Pass, 2013

Orangutan 
 Ember, 2008
 Surprised Cococnut (EP), 2000

Brontosaurus 
 The Monkey and The Whale, 2006

The Zennor Project 
 Twist (EP), 2001

References 

Living people
1974 births
English male singer-songwriters